Chaetogastra clinopodifolia is a species of flowering plant in the family Melastomataceae, native to south and southeastern Brazil. It was first described by Augustin de Candolle in 1828. One of its synonyms is Tibouchina clinopodifolia.

References

clinopodifolia
Flora of Brazil
Plants described in 1828